Mauro Abrahán Valiente (born 26 January 2000) is an Argentine professional footballer who plays as a forward for Alvarado on loan from Talleres.

Club career
Valiente's career began with Talleres, who he joined in 2013 from Cultural Luque. He was part of the club's U20 team at the 2018 U-20 Copa Libertadores, notably scoring one goal in three matches. He was moved into Talleres' first-team later that year under Juan Pablo Vojvoda, marking his professional debut with a twenty-two minute appearance at the end of a 1–1 draw with Vélez Sarsfield on 22 September. Four further appearances followed across 2018–19 and 2019–20.

On 17 January 2020, Valiente, alongside teammate Carlos Villalba, was loaned to Uruguayan Primera División club Rentistas until the end of the year. He made his debut in a win away to Boston River on 22 February, before scoring on his first home appearance against Deportivo Maldonado on 7 March.

In February 2021, Valiente joined Alvarado on loan for the rest of 2021. In January 2022, the loan-spell was extended with one more year.

International career
Valiente was selected for Argentina U19 training in 2018.

Personal life
In December 2020, it was revealed that Valiente had tested positive for COVID-19; amid the pandemic.

Career statistics
.

References

External links

2000 births
Living people
Sportspeople from Córdoba Province, Argentina
Argentine footballers
Association football forwards
Argentine expatriate footballers
Argentine Primera División players
Uruguayan Primera División players
Primera Nacional players
Talleres de Córdoba footballers
C.A. Rentistas players
Club Atlético Alvarado players
Expatriate footballers in Uruguay
Argentine expatriate sportspeople in Uruguay